Alexa Lea Gray (born August 7, 1994) is a Canadian volleyball player. She is part of the Canadian women's national volleyball team. Professionally, she plays for Series A1 Italian league Imoco Volley Conegliano.

Personal life

Gray attended high school at Centennial High School in Calgary. She began playing volleyball in sixth grade and played for Calgary Dinos women’s volleyball club and helped them to U15 and U17 provincial champ titles and U16 and U17 national champ title. 

She also played rugby and basketball in high school.

Gray has attributed her motivation to her late mother, Stacey French. Her mother was also an athlete and played basketball at Southern Utah. When Gray was 13, she and her sister survived a car accident that claimed her mother's life. While driving from Montana, an elk struck the car, causing it roll several times. Gray's father, Evric Gray, played basketball at UNLV and is a high school basketball coach.

Gray is a Mormon, and opted to attend Brigham Young University to play in college.

Career

College

Gray played for BYU and was three time All-American. In her first season in 2012, she was named West Coast Conference Freshman of the Year. She won West Coast Conference player of the year back-to-back in 2014 and 2015. She helped BYU to a national runner up finish in 2014, the first time BYU ever made it to a championship match. 

She finished her career at BYU ranked second in kills and attempts and sixth in points (all which ranked first during rally-scoring era) and sets played.

Professional clubs

  GS Caltex Seoul KIXX (2016–2017)
  Volley Soverato (2017–2018)
  Casalmaggiore (2018–2019)
  Golden Tulip Volalto Caserta (2019–2020)
  Scandicci (2019–2020)
  Busto (2020–2022)
  Imoco Volley Conegliano (2022-present)

Canadian national team

Gray joined the Canadian national team in 2017.

She participated at the 2018 FIVB Volleyball Women's World Championship, 2018 Women's Pan-American Volleyball Cup, and 2019 FIVB Volleyball Women's Challenger Cup. She has won international awards with the national team: she was named "Best Scorer" and "Best Spiker" at the 2019 FIVB Volleyball Women's Challenger Cup and "Best Spiker" at the 2019 Women's NORCECA Volleyball Championship. She was named the MVP at the 2019 FIVB Volleyball Women's Challenger Cup qualification.

Awards and honors

College
 AVCA All American – First Team (2015); Second Team (2014); Third Team (2013)
 West Coast Conference Player of the Year – 2014, 2015
 West Coast Conference Freshman of the Year – 2012

International
 2019 Women's NORCECA Volleyball Championship – Best Spiker
 2019 FIVB Volleyball Women's Challenger Cup – Best Spiker
 2019 FIVB Volleyball Women's Challenger Cup – Best Scorer
 2019 FIVB Volleyball Women's Challenger Cup qualification  – Most Valuable Player

References

Exteneral links
 
 Busto bio
 

1994 births
Living people
Canadian women's volleyball players
Sportspeople from Lethbridge
Outside hitters
BYU Cougars women's volleyball players
Expatriate volleyball players in Italy
Expatriate volleyball players in South Korea
Serie A1 (women's volleyball) players
Canadian expatriate sportspeople in South Korea
Canadian expatriate sportspeople in Italy
Canadian expatriate sportspeople in the United States
Black Canadian sportswomen
Canadian people of American descent
Expatriate volleyball players in the United States
Canadian Latter Day Saints